Mondotrack is a trademarked synthetic track surface used for Track and field athletics. Mondotrack is developed by Mondo, a world leader in Track and field surfacing. Research was done to achieve the best possible surface for track events that will enhance performance and decrease the chance of injury. All Mondotracks come with a woven top layer and a hexagonal base layer. Unlike other tracks, Mondotracks can be different colors. Mondotracks are very prominent around the world.

History 
In 1980, Mondo, with the help of several biomechanical research laboratories from around the world, began researching new material for an athletic track surface. Mondo's goal was to improve "athletic performance, comfort and safety". The result of their research was the innovative Mondotrack. Since then, Mondotrack has become a staple synthetic track surface used all over the world. Many colleges in the United States and professional track and field venues like the one used in the 2011 IAAF World Championships have had Mondotrack as their surface.

Many international competitions have also elected to use Mondotrack; recent uses have included the 2016 Olympic Games and the 2012 Olympic Games. Over 260 world records have been set on a Mondotrack.

Surface 

Mondotrack comes in several variations: Mondotrack WS (Championship series), Super X Performance, and Super X 720. The surface is a seamless structure that is created through a vulcanized process. Two distinct layers make up the track: The top layer being a rubber-based soft surface and the bottom layer being a hard elongated hexagonal surface. The thickness is 13.5 mm and is available in eight different colors. Mondotrack comes in rolls no longer than 15 meters in length that are then assembled to make the complete track.

Spikes 
Because of the design of the Mondotrack surface, certain spikes for running shoes are required. Compression (Christmas tree) spikes and 6mm (1/4in) pyramid spikes are promoted for use on Mondotracks. These spikes will not damage the track. Needle spikes however, will damage the track. The thin-sharp pointed needle spikes allow the spike to penetrate the surface which can rupture and degrade the track over time.

References

Sport of athletics terminology